The Moluccan thrush has been split into two species:

 Buru thrush (Zoothera dumasi)
 Seram thrush (Zoothera joiceyi)

Animal common name disambiguation pages